Jiří Pauer  (22 February 1919 in Libušín, Czechoslovakia – 28 December 2007 in Prague, Czech Republic) was a Czech composer.

Pauer studied first with Otakar Šín, then from 1943 to 1946 at the Prague Conservatory with Alois Hába, and finally with Pavel Bořkovec at the Academy of Performing Arts in Prague. He later taught for many years at the Academy where his pupils included composer Jiří Gemrot. He has composed many pieces, many of which focus on the brass orchestral instruments, symphonies, and further orchestra pieces, a bassoon concerto, a horn concerto and a trumpet concerto, chamber music pieces, and piano pieces. His opera Zdravý nemocný, based on Molière's Le Malade imaginaire, premiered at the Prague National Theatre on 22 May 1970.

In 1989 Jiří Pauer was dismissed from his post as general director of the National Theatre in Prague, because of his support for the policies of the former Communist Czechoslovak government. Pauer had locked staff out of the National and Smetana theatres on 17 November 1989 to prevent the opera, ballet and drama companies from staging protest performances. After a three-week strike Pauer was replaced by Ivo Žídek.

Selected works
Zuzana Vojířová opera, 1958
Concerto for Bassoon and Orchestra, 1949
Concerto for Horn and Orchestra, 1957
Wind Quintet, 1961
12 Duets for Viola and Cello, 1969–1970
Concert Music, 1971
Concerto for Trumpet and Orchestra, 1972
Trompetina for Trumpet and Piano, 1972
Trombonetta for Trombone and Piano, 1974–1975
Intrada for 3 Pianos, 3 Trumpets, and 3 Trombones, 1975
Tubonetta for Tuba and Piano, 1976
Hymn for communist party, 1977
Characters for Brass Quintet, 1977–1978
12 Duets for 2 Trompets (or Horns), 1983
Trio for 3 Horns, 1986

References

The information in this article is based on that in its German equivalent in the German Wikipedia.

1919 births
2007 deaths
People from Libušín
Czech composers
Czech male composers
Czech opera composers
Male opera composers
Male classical composers
20th-century Czech male musicians
Czechoslovak musicians